Alberto González Pérez (born 31 March 1983) is a Spanish footballer who plays as a central defender.

References

External links

1983 births
Living people
Spanish footballers
Footballers from Cantabria
Association football defenders
Segunda División players
Segunda División B players
Gimnástica de Torrelavega footballers
Real Unión footballers
UD Salamanca players
UE Lleida players
Real Balompédica Linense footballers
Sestao River footballers